Francis Patrick Leary (February 26, 1881 – October 4, 1907) was a pitcher in Major League Baseball. He played for the Cincinnati Reds in 1907.

References

External links

1881 births
1907 deaths
Major League Baseball pitchers
Cincinnati Reds players
Baseball players from Massachusetts
Rochester Bronchos players
Toronto Maple Leafs (International League) players
Harrisburg Senators players